Jeferson Moreira (born 27 September 1965) is a Brazilian equestrian. He competed in two events at the 2008 Summer Olympics.

References

External links
 

1965 births
Living people
Brazilian male equestrians
Olympic equestrians of Brazil
Equestrians at the 2008 Summer Olympics
People from Passo Fundo
Sportspeople from Rio Grande do Sul